Suzie is a 2009 French-Canadian drama film directed by and starring Micheline Lanctôt.

Plot
Suzie (Micheline Lanctôt), a 58-year-old taxi driver suffering from depression, finds a 10-year-old autistic boy named Charles (Gabriel Gaudreault) alone in the back seat of her cab one Halloween night. The boy's mother has left him with a note directing that he be taken to his father. Suzie takes Charles to his father, and thus gets drawn into a conflict between the boy's parents. Realizing the parents have no idea what to do with their son, Suzie leaves with him, and proceeds to go to an underground gambling den. She wins money at poker and buys two plane tickets to Morocco, intending to search for her daughter, who was taken to the country by her father twenty years ago.

Cast
Micheline Lanctôt as Suzie
Gabriel Gaudreault as Charles
Pascale Bussières as Viviane
Normand Daneau as Pierre
Marie-Yong Godbout-Turgeon as Caroline
Fayolle Jean as Cerfrère
Lulu Hughes as Constable
Artur Gorishti as Fatos
Suzanne Garceau as Psychiatrist

References

External links

2009 films
Canadian drama films
Films about autism
2009 drama films
Films directed by Micheline Lanctôt
French-language Canadian films
2000s Canadian films